Where the Red Fern Grows is a 1961 children's novel by Wilson Rawls about a boy who buys and trains two Redbone Coonhounds for hunting. The book is a work of autobiographical fiction based on Rawls' own childhood in the Ozarks.

Plot summary
Billy Coleman, a middle-aged man, rescues a redbone hound under attack by neighborhood dogs. He takes it home with him so that its wounds can heal. In light of this event, he has a flashback to when he was a ten-year-old boy living in the Ozark Mountains. 

Young Billy Coleman wants nothing more than a pair of hounds for coon hunting. After seeing a magazine ad for coon hounds, Billy spends the next two years working odd jobs to earn the $50 he needs to buy two puppies. Billy's dogs are delivered to Tahlequah, over 20 miles away. Billy decides to walk the distance. As he returns with the dogs, he sees a heart carved on a tree with the names "Dan + Ann" and decides to name the puppies Little Ann and Old Dan. With his grandfather's help, Billy teaches his dogs to be very loyal to each other and to Billy.

The first night of hunting season, Billy promises the dogs that if they tree a coon, he will do the rest. They tree one in a huge sycamore, which Billy believes is far too large to chop down. Remembering his promise to his dogs, Billy spends the next two days attempting to chop down the sycamore. Exhausted, Billy prays for the strength to continue, whereupon a strong wind blows the tree over.

Billy and his hounds become well-known as the best hunters in the Ozarks. Billy's grandfather makes a bet with Rubin and Rainie Pritchard that Old Dan and Little Ann can tree the legendary "ghost coon" that has eluded hunters for years. After a long, complicated hunt, Old Dan and Little Ann manage to tree the raccoon, but having seen how old and smart the ghost coon is, Billy cannot bring himself to kill it. Billy tries to stop the Pritchards from killing the raccoon, leading to a fight with Rubin. The Pritchards' dog Old Blue joins the fight, provoking Old Dan and Little Ann to attack Old Blue to drag him away from Billy. Rubin tries to drive Billy's dogs away with Billy's axe, but trips and falls on the blade, and dies. Billy is deeply troubled by the tragic turn of events, and Rainie runs away from the accident in horror. Even after the tragedy, Billy does not regret his choice to spare the ghost coon.

Billy's grandfather enters him into a championship coon hunt against experienced hunters. Before the main hunt starts Billy enters Little Ann into a beauty hound competition. She wins, so Billy gets to take home a small silver cup as his prize. The hunt is scheduled during a particularly cold week, and many of the other hunters are forced to give up. However, Billy, who is used to mountain winters, is able to reach the final round. On the last night, Old Dan and Little Ann trap three raccoons in a single tree, but a sudden blizzard forces Billy to take shelter. The following morning, the dogs are found covered in ice but still circling the tree. All three raccoons are captured and Billy and his dogs win the championship and a $300 prize.

One night while the trio is hunting, a mountain lion attacks the dogs. Billy fights to save his dogs, but the mountain lion turns on him. The dogs manage to save Billy by killing the mountain lion, but Old Dan later dies of his injuries. Over the next few days, Little Ann loses the will to live and finally dies of grief atop Old Dan's grave, leaving Billy heartbroken. 

Billy's father tries to comfort his son by explaining that he and Billy's mother have long wished to move to town where their children can get an education, but could not afford to do so without the extra money brought in by Billy's hunting. Knowing that Billy's dogs would suffer in town and that Billy would be devastated to leave them behind, they intended to allow Billy to live with his grandfather. Billy's father believes that God took the dogs as a sign that the family was meant to stay together.  

On his last day in the Ozarks, Billy visits Old Dan and Little Ann's graves and finds a giant red fern growing between them. Remembering a legend that only an angel can plant a red fern, Billy also comes to believe that perhaps there truly was a higher power at work.

The adult Billy closes by saying that although he hasn't returned to the Ozarks, he still dreams of visiting his dogs' graves and seeing the red fern again one day.

Films

The novel was the basis of a 1974 film starring Stewart Petersen, James Whitmore, Beverly Garland, and Jack Ging. A sequel was released in 1992, starring Wilford Brimley, Chad McQueen, Lisa Whelchel, and Karen Carlson. The film was remade in 2003 and starred Joseph Ashton, Dabney Coleman, Ned Beatty and Dave Matthews.

Reception

Although sales of the novel began slowly, by 1974 over 90,000 copies had been sold. In 2001, Publishers Weekly estimated that it had sold 6,754,308 copies.  

There is a statue of Billy and his dogs at the Idaho Falls Public Library.

Characters in the book
Billy, a ten-year-old boy who lives in the Ozark Mountains of Oklahoma
Little Ann, Billy's girl pup
Old Dan, Billy's boy pup
Mama, Billy's mother
Papa, who buys Billy the traps and teaches him how to use them
Grandpa, Billy's grandfather and owner of the country general store
Billy's 3 sisters
Rubin Pritchard, who dies of an axe injury after he attempts to attack Billy's dogs
Rainie Pritchard, Rubin's younger brother and a troublemaker. He idolized his older brother; when Rubin died, Rainie was devastated.
The Marshal of Tahlequah
Old Man Hatfield, a neighbor of Billy's
Mr. Kyle
Mr. Benson, another coonhunter
Dr. Lathman, another coonhunter

See also
Key Underwood Coon Dog Memorial Graveyard
Rainbow Bridge (pets)
The Hunt (The Twilight Zone)
Variant Creutzfeldt–Jakob disease (Kuru) from eating squirrel brains.

References

External links
Oracle Think Quest, Education Foundation: Where the Red Fern Grows.
SparkNotes: Where the Red Fern Grows.

1961 American novels
American children's novels
American novels adapted into films
Novels set in Oklahoma
Novels set in the 1930s
Children's novels about animals
Doubleday (publisher) books
Ozarks in fiction
1961 children's books
Novels about dogs